Mark John Banker (born January 15, 1956) is an American football coach. Banker is currently the safeties coach at Washington State University. He was previously the assistant head coach and inside linebackers coach at the University of Hawaii. Previously, he served the defensive coordinator of the Nebraska Cornhuskers, the Oregon State Beavers and the San Diego Chargers.

Coaching career
Banker has coached for the USC Trojans and in the National Football League for the San Diego Chargers. He followed Mike Riley from Oregon State to Nebraska when Riley was hired by the Cornhuskers in 2014. On January 11, 2017, after Riley and Banker coached Nebraska to two poor seasons, Banker was relieved of his duties as defensive coordinator. He was replaced by Bob Diaco. On January 5, 2018, it was announced that Banker was hired to be the assistant head coach and inside linebackers coach under Nick Rolovich at the University of Hawaii.

Personal life 
Banker graduated from Springfield College in Massachusetts in 1978 with a B.A. in physical education. Banker and his wife Debbie have 3 children, Chris, Jayme and Kelsey.

References

External links
 Washington State profile

1956 births
Living people
American football running backs
Cal State Northridge Matadors football coaches
Hawaii Rainbow Warriors football coaches
National Football League defensive coordinators
Nebraska Cornhuskers football coaches
Oregon State Beavers football coaches
San Diego Chargers coaches
Springfield Pride football coaches
Springfield Pride football players
Stanford Cardinal football coaches
USC Trojans football coaches
Washington State Cougars football coaches
People from Plymouth, Massachusetts
Sportspeople from Plymouth County, Massachusetts